Masoud Nazarzadeh (born April 10, 1983) is a retired Iranian footballer who is the current manager of Fayzkand in the Tajikistan Higher League.

Career

Club
Nazarzadeh joined Shahin Bushehr in 2010 after spending the previous two seasons at Bargh Shiraz.

Managerial
Nazarzadeh was named as Fayzkand's Head Coach during their squad announcement for the 2022 Tajikistan Higher League season.

Club career statistics

Honours

Club
Shahin Bushehr
Hazfi Cup Runner up (1): 2011–12

Padideh
Azadegan League (1): 2013–14

References

1983 births
Living people
Mes Rafsanjan players
Bargh Shiraz players
Shahin Bushehr F.C. players
Sanat Mes Kerman F.C. players
Shahr Khodro F.C. players
Iranian footballers
Association football wingers
Association football fullbacks